The Billboard Hot 100 is a record chart that ranks the best-performing singles in the United States. The chart is published by Billboard magazine and issued weekly; chart rankings are based primarily on each single's weekly sales and radio airplay figures. Throughout the history of the Hot 100, several alterations and additions have been incorporated to the methods by which chart data is obtained and compiled. Until 1991, sales and airplay information was compiled based on reports from record stores and radio playlists. Billboard has since utilized tracking systems such as Nielsen SoundScan and Nielsen Broadcast Data Systems in compiling the chart.

In 1987, one-hundred twenty-three singles reached the top ten of the Hot 100. One-hundred twelve singles reached their peaks within the year, while the remaining eleven reached their peaks in preceding and succeeding years. "Walk Like an Egyptian" by American rock band The Bangles topped the 1987 Billboard year-end chart for the most successful singles of the year. American recording artist Madonna scored four top ten hits in 1987—"Open Your Heart", "La Isla Bonita", "Who's That Girl" and "Causing a Commotion"—the most for any artist in the year. Among the genres that surged in popularity during the year was hard rock, with bands such as Poison, Whitesnake and Bon Jovi experiencing massive commercial success on Billboard charts. All three acts reached the top ten of the Hot 100 in 1987, with the latter two topping the chart with their respective singles "Here I Go Again" and "Livin' on a Prayer". Urban contemporary music also reached a wider audience, with artists such as Lisa Lisa and Cult Jam and Exposé scoring several top ten hits.

Top ten singles

1986 peaks

1988 peaks

References

General sources

Joel Whitburn Presents the Billboard Hot 100 Charts: The Eighties
Additional information obtained can be verified within Billboard's online archive services and print editions of the magazine.

External links
 Billboard website
 Billboard Hot 100 page

1987
United States Hot 100 top ten singles